Brigadier General David McCarty Stone Cottage is a historic home located at Coeymans Landing, Albany County, New York. It was built about 1770, and is a -story, Colonial period stone dwelling.  It measures roughly 20 feet by 40 feet in size and has a moderately pitched gable roof sheathed with 19th century metal shingles.  It was the home of General David McCarty, who was an active participant in the
events leading up to the American Revolution, served in the Continental Army and held numerous appointments in the post revolutionary era.

It was listed on the National Register of Historic Places in 2015.

References

Houses on the National Register of Historic Places in New York (state)
Colonial architecture in New York (state)
Houses completed in 1770
Houses in Albany County, New York
National Register of Historic Places in Albany County, New York
1770 establishments in the Province of New York